List of Turkish exonyms in Bulgaria lists Turkish exonyms for places in Bulgaria. Although most of the places are used with Bulgarian names, they are also known with Turkish exonyms especially among the Turkish population.

This is the list of Turkish exonyms for places in Bulgaria.

Abrasko selo Abbas köy
Abrit Abdul-ehat//Abdat kalesi
Adımovo Adım
Agatopolis Ahta-pol
Agatovo Ağaç-Ova
Ahryansko Ercek
Ahtopol Ahtabolu, Ahtenbolu
Aitos Aydos
Akandzhievo Akıncı
Aksakovo Acemler
Albanitsa Ablaniçe
Albantsi Arnavutlar
Aleko Akça-er
Aleko Konstantinovo Acılar/Alacalar
Alekovo Akçar, Akça-er
Aleksandriya Kapaklı
Aleksandrovo Bayraktar-mahalle, Çerkez-köy, Hasan-oğlu, Kara-Hasan
Alekseevo Sarı-Mahmut
Altsek Kilisecik, Kesecik
Angelariy Soyaklı
Angelovo Siyahlar
Anhialo, Pomorie Ah-yolu
Aprilovo Lefeci
Apriltsi Abdullar
Ardino Eğridere
Arsovo As-mahalle
Asen Örenli
Asenets Hasan-köy
Asenova Krepost Ahsen-kale
Asenovgrad İstanimaka, Vodene-i Balâ, Vodene-i Zir
Asenovo Upçeli
Atanasova Atanas-köy
Atimovo Kuzgun, Kuzgunluk
Avliene, Asenovets Agıh-Yeni
Avramov Köpekli
Avramovo İbrahimler
Avren Evren
Avtoevo Şişmanlar
Austa Bayram-köy
Aydınovo Aydın-köy
Ayrovo Ram-köy, Ramiş
Azmanite Azmanlar
Babel Geren
Badeşte Ahi-köy
Bagra Boyacı-köy
Bagriltsi Alacılar
Bagryanka Boyacılar
Balabanovo Balabanlar/Balabanlı
Balchik Balçık
Balgaranovo Kademler
Balgareevo Gavur-söğütçük
Balgarski Chardak Çardak
Balkan Dağ-mahalle
Bansko Baniçka
Baratsi Baraklar
Barduche Bardakçı
Bashtino Baba-mahalle
Bashtinovo Babalar
Bata Batacık
Batova Çatallar
Bayachevo Bayaç-köy
Baykovo Bay-kocalar
Bdintsi Gökçe-dölük
Bektaşi Bektaşlar/Beştaşlar
Bela Ak-dere, Astra
Bela Reka Çit-ak
Belgun Duranlar
Beli Dol Dere-köy
Belintsi Akçalar
Beli Plast Akça-kayrak
Belite Brezi Ak-kayınlar
Belogradchik Belgradçık
Beloklas Buğdaylı
Belo Polyane Ak-alan
Belovo Gebece
Belozem Giren
Benkovski Doğancıklı, Hacı-Sinanlar/Hacı Hasanlar
Berkovitsa Berkofça
Bezhantsi Göçmenler
Bezmer Abdullah/Avdullah, Hamza-ören
Bikovo Boğalı
Bilka Çiftlik-mahalle
Biser İncili
Bistra Ak-pınar
Bistra Ayladın/Alaeddin
Bistren Alacalı
Bistrentsi Göl-pınar
Bistrets Büyük-pınar
Blagoevgrad Yukarı Cuma, Cuma-i Bâlâ
Blagovets Hacı-köy
Blagun Ayvalık
Blaguntsi Hacı-köy
Blaskovo Aslı-beyli
Blatets Esirli
Blatino Göl-çiftlik, Göl Çiflik
Blatnitsa Durak-kulak
Bliznets Ekizce
Boevitsa Hacı-Hamza
Bogdan Dereli
Bogdanitsa Hoca-köy
Bogdantsi Abdal-köy/Abdul-köy
Bogorov Dol Gazi-oğullar
Bogorovo Arpaç
Boil Emirler
Bolyarino Bey-köy
Bolyarovo Paşaköy
Bolyarski Izvor Bey-pınar
Bolyarsko Emirli
Bolyartsi Alem-beyler, Beyci-oğlu
Borika Çamcağız
Borikovo Hasan-kova
Boril Baykal-beşli, Beşli
Borilovo Hamzalar
Borino Kara Bulak
Borislavtsi Adaçalı
Borisovgrad Hacı-İlyas/Hacı-Eles
Borisovo Aşaklı
Borov Dol Çam-dere
Boroviha Çamlıca
Borovitsa Çam-dere
Borovo Çam-çiftlik, Çıracı
Borovsko Çam-dere-karamanlar
Borushtitsa Büyük-dere
Boryana Çamurlu
Bosilek Bekir-ağa-mahallesi
Bosilkovtsi Çatmı
Bostanite Bostan-mahalle
Bostantsi Bostancılar
Botevgrad Orhaniye
Botevo Çömlek-köy
Botka Hacı-köy
Boyadzhik Boyacık
Boyan Botove Durak-köy
Boynen İsmailler
Bozartsi Arabacı
Bozhak Deliciler
Bozhitsa Horanlar/Horonlar
Bozveliysko Kadı-köy
Bradvari Baltacı-yeni-köy
Brani Pole Ahlan-ova
Bratovo Can-kardaş
Bratya Daskalovi Burunsuz
Brayagovets Gedikler
Brestitsa Göl-kara-ağaç
Brestovo Hacı-köy
Brezen Halaç-dere
Brod Göçürlü
Brusino Bursacık
Bryastovo Boz-ağaç
Buhovtsi Buhlar
Buk Almalı-dere
Bukak Hacı-köy
Buzovgrad Harman-köy
Byal Bryak Ak-yar
Byal Izvor Ak-pınar
Byal Kladenets Ak-pınar
Byala Gradets Akçe-hisar, Aşağı-akçalar
Byala Polyana Akça-alan
Byala Reka Ak-dere
Bryazovo Abraşlar
Burgas Burgaz
Byala Slatina Akislatine
Chakalarovo Çakal-köy
Chakaltsi Çakallar
Chakmatsi Çakmaklar
Chal Çal-cedit
Chalakovi Doğanca
Chavdar Kolanlar
Chavdartsi Çavdar-mahalle
Chavka Şadiler
Chayka Çaylak
Chegantsi Hacı-mahalle
Chekantsi Duranlar
Chelnik Gedikli
Chepelare Çepelli
Chepino Çepine
Chepintsi Çangır-dere, Çepinli
Cherepovo Güdüller
Cheresha İçme-vakıf
Chereshak Kirazlık
Chereshe Kokar-içme
Chereshnitsa Kirazlı
Cherganovo Çergenli
Cherkaski Hacı-mahalle
Cherkovna Anızcık
Cherna Karalar, Yenice
Chernalevo Kara-burun
Cherna Cherkva Kara-kilise
Cherna Gora Kara-orman
Cherna Mogila Kara-tepe
Cherna Niva Kara-tarla
Cherna Skala Kara-kaya
Cherna Voda Kara-su, Gündüzler
Chernegirovo Çeşnegir-yeni-mahalle
Chernevo Arap-mahalle
Chernichani Arap-ova
Cherni Ochi Karagözler
Cherni Rid Kara-tepe
Cherni Vit Kara-vit
Cherni Vrah Kara-tepe, Kara-burun
Chernichevo Dutlu
Chernichino Çayır
Chernik Kayalar
Chernoglavtsi Karabaşlı
Chernogor Karadırlar
Chernogorovo Kara-orman
Chernokaptsi-Karabaş köy
Chernolik Kara-ese-köy
Chernomortsi İsmail-köy
Chernoochene Karagözler, Pazar/Yeni pazar
Chernook Kara-köse
Chernookovo, Dobrich Province Kara-göz-kuyusu, Kara-gözler
Chernookovo, Shumen Province Kara-göz-kuyusu, Kara-gözler
Chernovo Karalar
Chernovtsi Kara-Musalar
Chernozem Kara-toprak
Cherven Kızıl
Cherven Breg Sarıyar
Cherven Bryag Kızıl Kıyı, Kızıl Yaka, Dobroluk
Chervena Skala kızıl-kaya
Chervena Voda Kızıl-su
Cherventsi Kızılcılar
Cheshma Çeşme-mahalle
Chichevo Küçük-ip-dere
Chilik Çelikler
Chintulovo Kasımlar
Chistovo Emir-oğlu
Chitashko Çataklar/Çitak, Çitak-vadisi
Chobanka Edir-hanlı
Chomakovo Kışla
Chorbadzhiysko Çorbacılar
Chorlovo Çorlu
Chubrika Dallıca, Fakı-pınar
Chuchuliga Abdurahman-köy
Chudomir Kara-ip/Kara-Eyüp
Chukarka Tas-tepe
Chukarovo Çukur-köy
Chukata Bayır-mahalle
Chukovets Tokmak-köy
Chukovo Tokmaklı-dere
Chumakovtsi Çomakoğlu
Chuprene Çupren
Chirpan Çırpan
Dablovo Yağ-kanlı
Dabnik Osman-köy
Dabova İmren-köy
Dabovan Çerçelen
Dabovets Hamzaç
Dabovo Meşeli
Dabrava Meşe-mahalle
Dabravino Çalı-mahalle
Dabravitsa Meşe-mahalle, Tekkeciler
Dabrova Kutluca
Dahovo Müslimler
Dalbok Izvor Koz-pınar
Dalgevo Uzunca
Dalgo Pol Yeni-köy
Dalgo Pole Uzun-kır-ova
Damyanitsa Orman-çiftlik
Dangovo Dıngırlar
Darets Höyüklü/Üyüklü
Darzhaven Çiftlik
Daskal Atanasovo Hacı-ayvalı
Davidovo Davutlar
Davitkovo Davut-ova
Dazhdets Umur-veren
Dazhdino Yağmur-köy
Dazhdovnik Yağmur-baba/Yağmurlar
Dazhdovnitsa Ömer-oğulları-yağmurlar
Debar Derbent
Debelets Kara-Ahmet-mahalle
Debelt Ak-ezli
Debelyanovo Kaba-ağaç
Debrene Köycük
Debrushtitsa Derecik-köy
Dedets Dedeler
Dedina Dede-mahalle
Dedintsi Dede-bal
Delchevo Ferhatlar, Üç-durak, Varatlar
Dennitsa Gündüzler, Orta-mahalle
Dermantsi Dermanlar
Dervishka Mogila Derviş-tepe
Desetkari Aşarı-köy
Detelina Derviş-Müslim
Devesilitsa Dikili-Haluren
Devesilovo Dikili-kayınlık
Devetak İsitli
Devetintsi Dokuz-ek
Devin Dövlen, Ropçoz
Devino Delveler, Kızlar-köy/Kazlar-köy
Devnya Devne
Diamandovo Hüsemler
Dibich Kasaplar
Dibsizka Mogila Dipsiz-höyük
Dichevo Kemal-köy
Dihanovtsi Celil-oğullar
Dimitar Ganevo Gelincik
Dimovo Osmaniye
Dinevo Çamurlu
Dink Dink-mahalle
Dinya Karpuzca
Div Dedovo Çengel
Dlazhko Uzunlar
Doborsko Bakiler
Dobra Polyana Bayram-alan
Dobrevo Ali-Hanife/Ali-Kalfa
Dobrič Hacıoğlu Pazarcık, Dobriç
Dobrich Göç-beyler
Dobri Dol Dede-köy
Dobrin Deveci-köy
Dobrina Cizdar-köy/Cızlar-köy
Dobrinovo Hamzalar, Has-beyli
Dobrintsi Hasan-oğullar
Dobri Voynukov Ası-köy/Has-köy
Dobrogled Eleç
Dobromir Kayrak-mahalle
Dobromirtsi  Emirler
Dobroplodno Eles-FAkı/İlyas-Fakı
Dobroselets Yavuz-dere
Dobrotich Şadi-köy
Dobrotino Dağ-çiftlik
Dobrotitsa Dobrucalar, Has-köy
Dobrovan Kalgamaç
Dobrovnitsa Karezli
Dobrovolets Büyük-erceli
Doktor Stambolov İmrahor
Dolapite Dolaplar
Dolentsi Aşağı-köy
Dolets Dere-mahalle
Dolina Aranvut-köy
Dolishte Tepe-altı
Dolna Glavanak Hüseyinler
Dolna Hubavka Aşağı-Hüseyinler
Dolna Kabda Aşağı-kab-dağ
Dolna Krepost Aşağı-karalar, Dere-mahalle
Dolna Mahala Aşağı-mahalle
Dolna Oryahovitsa Aşağı-Rahova
Dolna Turgan Aşağı-Turgan
Dolni Chiflik Aşağı Çiflik
Dolni Izvor Aşağı-Musa-bey
Dolni Voden Aşağı-Voden
Dolno Ablanovo Ablanova-İ-Yasa
Dolno Avramovo Ganollar
Dolno Belovo Akçe-İbrahim
Dolno Çerkovişte Alemdar/Alem-dere
Dolno Ezerovo Baya-köy/Vaya-köy
Dolno Izvorovo Aşağı-isiva
Dolno Kozarevo Aşağı-keçiciler, Has-keçiciler
Dolno Levski Kalağlar
Dolno Pole Nebi-köy
Dolno Rehovo Aşağı-Rahova
Dolno Sadievo Kadı-köy/Kadı-viran
Dolno Sahrane Aşağı-sahrane
Dolnoseltsi Aşağı-Übrü-eren
Dolno Shivachevo Terziler
Dolno Slaveykovtsi Damlalı-ehatlar
Dolno Varshilo Dere-harman
Dolno Voyvodino Aşağı-çitaklar, Çitaklar
Domishte Anlık
Dondukovo Tatar-mahalle
Donkino Çakallar
Dositeevo Sülya-köy
Dospat Dospat
Doyransko Doyuranlar
Doyrantsi Doyranlar, Demir-oğullar
Drachevo Kırk-çalı
Draganovets Bolluk-su
Draganovo Arnavut-köy, Büyük-ip-dere, Semiz-ala
Dragantsi Hacı-balabanlı
Dragash Voyvoda Ermenli
Dragomazh Hüseyinler
Dragomir Yağlar
Dragomirovo Deli-Sülü
Dragovo Civirli
Dragovtsi Halil-hoca-mahalle
Dragoynovo Kozluk
Drandar Hallaçlı, Mağlıç
Drangovo Komarlar
Drazhevo Atlı
Drenovets Diren-ufça
Drentsi Ahlar/Ahiler
Drinovo Bahşişler/Bahşışlar
Dropla Toy-köy, Toy-kuyusu
Drumevo Abdülrezzak
Druzhintsi Ortakçı
Dryankovets Kızılcık
Dryanovets Recep-köy, Sağırlar
Dryanovo Kızılcıklı
Dryanovo Direnova
Duhovets Nasufçular
Dulovo Ak Kadınlar
Dunavitsi Bahaslı
Dunavtsi Bayasıllı
Dupnitsa Dupniçe, Dobniçe
Durovtsi Durlar
Durumche Göçiler
Dushinkovo Can-başlı
Dushka Hacı-Yürük
Duvanli Doğancı/Doğanlı
Dve Kashti İki-evler
Dve Mogili İki Tepe
Dve Topoli Ahatlar-Kebir
Dvorishte Orta
Dyadovo Dede-köy
Dyadovsko Dede-köy
Dyadovtsi Dedeler
Dyakonovo Kara-başlar
Dyankovo Kal-ova
Dyulevo Ayvacık, Ayvacık-dere-köy
Dyulgeri Dülgerli
Dyulino Ayvacık
Dyulitsa Ayvacık
Dzhanka Dere-köy
Dzhebel Cebel, Şeyh-cumaya
Dzhelepsko Celepler
Dzherevo Arabacı
Dzhinot Cin-koca
Dzhinovo Cin-ova
Dzhrebovo Aygır-dere
Dzhubra Abdal-köy/Abdi-oğlu-köy
Edil Edil-oğullar
Ednovertsi İmam-oğullar
Efreyter Bakalovo Baraklar
Ekzarh Yosif Kara-kocalı
Elhovets Yanuz-dere
Elenovo Fübeller
Elhovo Kızılağaç
Elshitsa Arnavut-köy
Emirsko Emir-köy
Enina/Yanina Keçi-deresi
Enchets Makaklar, Salman-cami-altı
Enevo Yesirce
Eniovets Ali-bey
Eredin Hayreddin
Eshikashli Şeyh-Aslı
Etropole Etrebolu
Ezbetsi Özbek
Ezerets Satılmış
Ezerevo Dipsiz-göl, Aladın
Gabar Cemeren
Gabarnitsa Ahır-köy
Gaber Gürgenli
Gaberovo Gürgen, Gürgen-köy
Gabra Çukur-ova
Gabritsa Gürgenli
Gabrovo Palanga, Gabrova
Gagovo Gag-ova
Galabets Güvençler, Tatar-köy
Galabinka Güvenli
Galabintsi Musa-kocalı
Galabnik Musa-bey
Galabovo Kara-pınar, Kum-doğancı
Garbishte Sırt-köy
Garvanovo Yeni-mahalle
Gaskovo Ördekler, Yürükler
Gavarevo Akbaş
Gavrailovo Değirmen-dere
Gaydartsi Gıygınlı
General Dobrevo Hacı-fakılar
General Geshevo Gölcük
General Inzov Ak-pınar
General Kantardzhievo Çavuş-köy
General Kiselovo Emirler
General Kolevo Çayır-harman
General Nikolaevo Kılıçlı
General Toshevo Kasım Köy, Talaşmanlı
General Tsonkovo Duraklar
Generalovo Paşa-köy
Genevo Emirler
Gergevets Ala-dağlı
Geshanovo Konak
Gigenska Mahala Gigen-mahalle
Glashatay Tellal-köy
Glavan Ali-Fakı
Glavatar Reis-köy
Glavatartsi Emir-oğullar, Şeyh-köy
Glavinitsa Asvalt-köy/Asfalt-köy, Başı-kır
Gledka Cebil-oğullar
Glodzhevo Loç-ova
Glogovets Köy-başları
Gluhar Sağırlar
Glumovo Soluklar
Gnezdare Ovacılar
Gnyazdovo Ovalar
Golemantsi Bey-köy
Golem Derbent Büyük-derbent
Golem Izvor Kara-Arnavut
Golem Porovets Büyük-kokarca
Golemo Buk Koca-kayın
Golemo Krushevo Ahlatlı
Golemo Novo Selo Büyük-yeni-köy
Golemo Selo Büyük-köy
Golen Bliznak Yayla
Golesh Köse-Aydın
Golobrad Köse-Hasanlar, Köstanlar
Golobradovo Köse-köy, Köseli
Golyam Devesil Dikili-Cafer
Golyama Bara Büyük-dere
Golyama Chinka Hardallar, Yağ-basan-kebir
Golyama Dolina Koca-inli
Golyama Smolnitsa Büyük-çamurlu
Golyama Voda Hasan-mahalle
Golyamo Asenovo Küçük-Hasan
Golyamo Bukovo Koca-bük
Golyamo Delchevo Deli-Hüseyin-mahalled
Golyamo Delyane Dere-köy
Golyamo Dryanovo Biçerli
Golyamo Gradishte Örencik
Golyamo Kamenyane Taşlı-çilingir
Golyamo Konare Büyük-koru-köy
Golyamo Shivachevo Terzi-obası
Golyamo Sokolovo Koca-doğan
Golyamo Tsirkovishte Büyük-tekkeler
Golyamo Tsarkvishte Tekkeler-sağır
Gorazd Balabanlı
Gorichevo Orman-beş-evli
Goritsa Orman, Kuru-köy, Türbeler
Gorna Banya Yukarı-banya
Gorna Hubavka Yukarı-Hüseyinler
Gorna Kabda Yukarı-kab-dağ
Gorna Krepost Karalar, Yuakrı-karalar
Gorna Kula Bala-burgaz
Gorna Mahala Yukarı-mahalle
Gorna Oryahovitsa Yukarı Rahova
Gorna Rositsa Yukarı-toz-patlar
Gorna Rozitsa Dereli
Gorna Spoluka Kerimler
Gorni Choban Çoban-köy
Gorni Chiftlik Yukarı-çiftlik
Gorni Glavanak Ak-baş-bağla
Gorni Izvor Yukarı-Musa-bey
Gorno Aleksandrovo Burgucu
Gorno Belovo Ala-beş
Gorno Botevo Şamlı
Gorno Cherkovishte Simitler
Gorno Hadzhiyska Hacı-mahalle
Gorno Izvorovo Yukarı-isiva
Gorno Kale Yukarı-kale
Gorno Kozarevo Yukarı-keçililer
Gorno Novkovo Has-kestane
Gorno Novo Selo Yeni-şar-köy, Yukarı-yeni-köy
Gorno Oryahovitsa Yukarı-Rahova
Gorno Pavlikene Kireçli
Gorno Pole Ovacık
Gorno Sahrane Yukarı-sahrane
Gornoseltsi Yukarı-Übrü-eren
Gorno Shivachevo Keller
Gorno Slaveykovo Yukarı-damlalı
Gorno Varshilo Sırt-harman
Gorno Voyvodino Çitaklar
Gorno Yabalkovo Yukarı-almalı
Gorovo İnce-köy
Gorska Polyana Yaylacık
Gorski Izvor Kuru-çeşme, Kuruca-dere
Gorsko Dağ-köy, Küçük-Yusuflar
Gorsko Dyulevo Cebel-Ayvalı
Gorsko Pisarevo Yazıcı-mahalle
Gorsko Selo Dağ-köy
Gorsko Slivovo Dağ-erik
Gorun Kırk-ağaç, Sarı-meşe
Goryani Yeni-çeri
Gospodarovo Bey-mahalle
Gospodinovo Çelebi-köy, Hıdır-çelebi
Gotse Delchev Nevrokop
Gotvarsko Ahçılar
Govedare Sığırcık
Gradets Dilciler
Gradina Çakarcı, Erci
Gradnitsa Pirli-köy
Gradsko Örencik
Graf Ignatievo Çulluk
Grafitovo Tekke-mahalle
Granichar Akıncı
Granitets Redep-mahalle
Granitovo Gacıl-ova
Greevtsi Urum-bey
Grivka Koca-Ahmetler
Grivyak Kara-Ahmetler
Grototsvet Ütükler
Grozden Sancaklar
Grudevo Boz-doğancı
Grudovo Kara-pınar
Gruevo Hayranlar
Gugutka Arnavut-köy
Guliya Nevse-taşlı
Guliyka Nevse-sipahiler
Gurkovo Nazır-mahalle, Yürükler
Gusla Davulcular
Guslar Kıdır-aşık
Gurgulitsa Arabacı
Gurkovo Hanköy, Gavur-köy
Hadzhi Dimitrovo Şekerli
Hadzhidimovo Hacı Dimovo, Singarya, Aşağı Singarya
Hadzhi Marinovo Cumalı
Hadzhievtsi Hacı-oğullar
Hadzhiysko Hacı-mahalle
Hadzhiyte Hacı
Hairedin Hayreddin
Halvadzhiysko Halvacılar
Hambar Ambar-dere
Harmanli Harmanlı
Harsovo Hırs-ova
Haskovo Hasköy
Hisarya Hissar
Hitrin Şeytancık
Hitovo Çayır-mahalle
Hitrino Şeytancık
Hlebarovo Torlak
Hodzhovtsi Hoca-köy
Hrabrovo Fethi-köy
Hrastovo Külcüler
Hristiyanovo Müslimler
Hvostyane Topallar
Ibrichevo İbrik
Ibryam Mahala İbrahim-mahalle
Iglika Kalaycı-köy
Igratovo Kara-bacak
Ihtiman İhtiman, Ahtiman
Ilinitsa Kırtıllı
Iliyno Ellezler
Iliysko İlyasçı
Imrenchevo İmrenler
Indzhe Voyvoda Urum-köy
Irali Erikli
Irechek Köylük
Irechekovo Arnavut-köy
Irnik Sağırlar
Ishirkovo Koçine, Yürük-oğulları
Iskra Ay-doğdu
Isperih Kemallar, İsperih
Isuflar Yusuflar
Ivancha Kurt-alan
Ivanovo Huy-ven, Uyvan, Yunusça
Ivan Vazovo Himitli
Ivantsi İsaklar, Esaflar
Ivaylo Kula-kasaplı
Ivaylovgrad Ortaköy
Izbul Göller
Izgrev Ay-doğdu, Derviş, Er-doğanlı, Gün-doğdu
Izvor Kaynarca, İriler
Izvornik Pınarlı
Izvorovo Pınarcık
Izvorsko Derbent
Kabile Tavşantepe, Kabiller
Kableshkovo Davutlu, Paşa-balı
Kachulka Kurancılar
Kadanche Büyükdere
Kadanka Hasanköy
Kadievo Kadıköy
Kalaydzhievo Kalaycılar
Kaliakra Celigra Burun, Kelegra, Kalyakara, Kaligra
Kalimantsi Gevrekler
Kalina Emirler
Kalinka Keremenler
Kalino Çamurlu
Kalitinovo Curanlı
Kalnishte Çamurlu-köy
Kalofer Kalufer
Kaloyan Yunus-pınar
Kaloyanets Cambazlar
Kaloyanovo Dutluca/Tutluca-tekke-bolu, Selçukova, 
Kaloyantsi Kara-bahaslı
Kalugerene Hoca-köy/Hocalar
Kaluger Mahala Kaluger-mahalle
Kalugerovo Keşiş-mahalle, Musacık-tekke
Kalushevo Yeni-köy
Kamburovo Kambur
Kamchiya Kamçı-mahalle
Kamen Demircili, Sevdalı
Kamenar Taşçı
Kamen Bryag Yurükler
Kamenari Yürükler
Kamen Vrah Taş-tepe
Kamenartsi Kayacı-başı
Kamen Bryak Kaya-bey-köy
Kamen Dyal Kaya-ardı
Kamenka Kayalar/Kaylar
Kamenna Arkarı-mahalle
Kamenna Reka Kayalı-dere
Kameno Kayalı
Kamenovo Güzelce-alan, Yeni-paslı
Kamensko Tşlık
Kamentsi Kayrak
Kamenyak Kalay-dere/Kalaylı, Kayalı-dere, Taşlı-köy/Taşlık
Kamenyane Taşlı-köy
Kamilski Dol Deve-dere
Kanchevo Aşıklı, Işıklı
Kandilka Evrenler
Kanevo İbrahimli
Kanino Kanlı-köy, Kına-köy
Kanliy Mecit-sünnetler
Kanyak Kara-köy-İbikler
Kaolinovo Bohçalar
Kapinets Kadir-köy
Kapinovtsi Kabullar
Kapishte Türbe/Tülbe
Kapitan Andreevo Viran Tekke
Kapitan Dimitrievo Ali-koç
Kapitan Dimitrovo Kadı-köy, Tatar-kadı-köy
Kapitan Petko Terbi-köy
Kapudzhi Kapıcı
Karadzhalovo Karacalar
Karamanite Karamanlar
Karamantsi Karamanlar
Karamfil Kulfalı
Kara Mihal Karamanlar
Karanovo Azaplı, Kispetli
Karantsi Karamca
Karavelovo Bey-alan, Kara-gözler, Kara-Veliler
Karchovsko Kalamçılar
Kardam Harman-kuyusu, Haydar
Kardzhali Kırcaali
Kargona Kargalı
Karlovo Karlıova
Karnobat Karinabat, Karınovası
Karpachevo Yürükler
Karvuna Kuyu-köy
Kaspichan Kaspi Çan
Katino Eğri-bucak
Katun Hatun
Kavarna Kavarna
Kavatsite Kavaklar
Kavrakirovo Orman
Kaynardzha Kaynarca
Kazak Kazaklı
Kazanka Kazan
Kazanlak Kızanlık, Kazanlık, Akça Kazanlık
Kazashka Reka Kazak-dere
Kazashko Kazak-mahalle
Kazatsite Kazaklı
Kazichane Gazi-canlar
Kermen Keremenli, Kermenli, Germiyanlı
Kesten Kestencik
Kestenyavo Kestane
Kichenitsa Killi-kuyucuk
Kilifarevo Kilifar
Kipra Taptık
Kirilovo Aşık-sinekli, Bunaklı
Kirkova Mahala Selim-mahalle
Kirkovo Kırkova
Kiselets Hasanlar
Kitanchevo Kıdır-köy
Kitino Hoca-köy
Kitka Bilek-Ahmet-mahalle, Çökek
Kitnitsa Yatacık
Kladenchevo Kara-pınar
Kliment Emberler
Klimentinovo Çırpılı, Küçükler
Klimentovo Kapaklı, Muşuklu
Klokotnitsa Semihçe
Klyuchevo Çilingir-mahalle
Knezha İsmail-pınar
Knezovo Emirler
Knizhovnik İde-bey-köy
Knyaz Borisovo Koraşlı
Knyazheva Polyana Bey-alan
Knyazhevo Bali-Efendi, Şahlı
Kobilyane Maşkılı
Kochmar Koçmarlı
Kochovo Koç-ova, Köteş
Kolari Arabacı
Kolarovo Arabacı-köy, Arabacı-ova, Arabacılar
Kolartsi Arabacı
Kolobir Bahar/Baylar
Kolyo Genchevo Muratlˆ
Komets Kazıklı
Komuniga Kuş-alan
Konare Selim-kuyusu
Konche At-alan
Kondovo Mürselim
Konevets Kaya-burun
Konevo At-köy, Atlı-oğlu, Beygirli/Bekirli, Kara-atlar
Konnitsa Sipahlar-burnu
Konop Kulfalar
Konstantin Ahmetli
Konstantinovets Bata-kanlı
Konstantinovo Dere-köy, Örencik, Tatar-köy
Konush Tatar-köy
Koshuta Deniz-köy
Koprivshtitsa Avratalan
Koren Kütüklü
Koriten Haralı/Hardallı
Kornisosh Kara-muş
Korovo Kor-ova
Kos Dere-köy, Kara-köy
Kosara Türk-kuyusu
Kosovets Kos-köy
Kosovo Kos-ova
Kosharitsa Kışla-dere
Kostena Reka Dere-köy
Kostilkovo Çekirdekli
Kostino Kemikler
Kostovo Kozlu-bük
Kostur Küstü-köy
Kosturino Dalakça
Kotel Kazan
Kotlari Kazancılar
Kotlentsi Hoş-kadem
Kovach Naldöken
Kovachevets Demirciler
Kovachevitsa Demirciler
Kovachevo Demirciler, Nalbantlar
Kovachevtsi Demirciler
Kovachite Nalbantlar
Kovachitsa Demirciler
Kovil Deli-Ahat, Sofular
Koynare Koy-nar
Kozhare Dericiler
Kozare Kara-kaya
Kozarevets Keçiler-mahalle/Yavuzlar
Kozarevo Kadı-köy
Kozhuhartsi Körlü-mahalle, Kürklü
Kozichino Erkeç
Kozin Dol Keçi-dere
Kozitsa Ahmet-dere, Keçiler
Kozla Reka Koz-dere
Kozlets Koçaşlı
Kozloduy Kozludere, Kotozluk
Kozloduytsi Osman-Fakı
Kozlovets Türk-eriği
Kozma kara-çufallar
Koznitsa Karamanca
Kozyak Keçiler-mahalle
Kozyakgrad Göz-eken
Kraguevo Şahinler
Kraishte Yenice-Haydar
Krakra Emir-Gazi
Kralevo Karlı-köy, Kırallı-köy
Kran Has-köy
Krapets Garipçe
Krasen Karalı
Krasen Dol Asıllar/Asiller, Çanakçı
Krasino Posunlar
Krashno Köse-köy
Krasimir Kazallık/Kazanlık
Krasino Denizler, Güzel-Gani
Krasholak Benli-köy
Krasnogor Deli-Yusuflar
Krasnoseltsi Kiliciler
Kravino İnekçi
Kraygortsi Abdurrahmanlar
Krayno Selo Al-aya/Ala-aya
Kraynovo Hoca-köy
Kremena Kara-yapılar
Krepcha Kirepçe
Krepost Büyük-örencik, Örencik
Krilatitsa Şah-pala
Krin Ahlatlı, Hasat
Kriva Reka Eğri-dere
Krivini Gebeş
Krivitsa Topal-köy
Krivo Pole Yere-basan
Kroyach Hasan-terzi
Kroyachevo Terzi-köy
Kroyatsi Terzi-köy
Krumovgrad Koşukavak
Krumovo Güğümlü, Kumluca, Paşa-mahalle, Yukarı-kumluca
Krumovo Gradishte Kulazlı
Krupen İrice
Krupishte Göç-beyler
Krusha Dülger
Krushak Armutlu
Krushari Armutlu
Krushata Armutluk
Krusheto Armutlu
Krushevets Kayrak-köy
Krushevska Maruflar
Krushevo Ahlat-köy, Ahlatlı, Halit-köy, Taraş-köy
Krushitsa Armutlu
Krushka Hamzalar
Krusholak Kelebek-mahalle
Krushovene Armutlu
Krushovo Araklar
Kubrat Balpınar, Bal Bunlar
Kudsovo Topallar
Kuklitsa Ezedenli
Kukuryak Erikli
Kula Kule, Adliye
Kula Sredne Kule
Kula Mahala Kule-mahalle
Kulata Kule
Kumanovo Yeni-köy
Kuptsite Bezirgan-köy
Kurtovo Uncular
Kurtovo Konare Kurt-ova
Kutlovitsa Oluklu
Kyosevo Köseler
Kyosevtsi Köseler
Kyostenets Köstence
Kyustendil Köstendil, Küstendil
Ladarevo Yukarı-orman
Ladzhene Licene
Laka Eski-paslı
Lale Kara-köy
Laskerovo Aşağı-orman/Orman
Latinka Ürpek
Lavavo Arslan-köy
Lavino Arslan
Lavska Arslanlar
Lenishte Alfatlar
Lenovo Ketenlik
Lensko Ketenli
Leshnikovo Fındıklı
Leshnitsa Aladanlı
Lesnovo Ormanlı
Leshtarka Koca-Musalar
Leshtak Fındıcak
Lesovo Urum-beyli
Letovnik Yazla
Letnitsa Leşnitsa, Türk Fındığı
Levski Karaağaç, Çatma
Lezharovo Dökmen
Lilkovo Demirci-köy
Lilyak Çekendin/Çikendin
Limets Kara-Şabanlar
Lipets Dörmete
Lisi Vrah Kilecik/Kalecik
Listets Karalılar/Kara-Aliler, Mesimler
Lokvata Göl-köy
Lom Pulmiye, Lom Palanga
Lomnitsa Mazlum-köy
Lomtsi Sipahiler
Lovchantsi Kara-sular
Lovech Lofça
Lovets Abdallar, Avcı-doğancı, Avdalar
Lozen Kara-Hasan
Lozenets Bağlar, Kara-bağlar, Seymen
Lozengradtsi Kara-kaş
Lozheto Yataklar
Lozevo Durmuş
Lozitsa Yeni-mahalle
Loznitsa Deli-Yusuf-kuyusu, Kubadın
Lozovo Bağ-tarla
Ludogorie Deliorman
Ludogortsi Duran
Ludza Azmak
Lukovit Yukarı Lükfe
Lulichka Kadı-köy
Lulitsa Çubuklu
Lyahovo Evlekler, Yassıca
Lyaskovets Fındıkçık
Lyaskovo Abdülrezzak, Fındıklı, Fındıkçık
Lyatno Yazla
Lyuben Kara-Mustafalar, Kara-Veli
Lyuben Karavelovo Sarı-göl
Lyubenets Gün-eli
Lyubeno Ömerler
Lyubenovo Gün-eli, Cadı-köy
Lyubentsi Raş-köy
Lyubichevo Aşıklar
Lyubimets Habibçeova
Lyubka Yeni-mahalle
Lyublen Dağ-yeni/Dar-yeni
Lyulin Yeni-mahalle
Lyulyakovo İdrisli, Kara-Baki, Kiremitlik
Lyuti Brod Geçit-köse
Machevo Manv-çiftlik
Madan Maden
Madrets Sofular
Madrevo Mesim-mahalle
Madrino Kadı-köy
Madzhari Macarlar
Madzharovo Yatakçık, Yatacık
Maglen Çımalı
Maglene Bulutlar
Maglishta Ardaşlı
Maglizh Mülüzler
Mahalata Mahalle
Mak Mıkmıl
Makak Makaklar
Makariopol Hasçı-köy
Makedonka Arnavutlar
Makedontsi Kışla-arası
Malinka Gacallar
Malak Devesil Dikili-kayrak
Malak Manastir Küçük=manastır
Malak Porovets Küçük-kokarca, Kokarca-mahalle
Malak Preslavets Kadı-köy
Malak Voden Dere-mahalle
Malak Zvenimir Ayvat-köy
Malaovo Kara-Nasuf
Malenovo Paşa-köy
Mali izvor Küçük-ak-pınar
Malka Arda Küçük-Arda
Malka Cherkovna Çıkrıkçılar
Malka Chinka Yağ-basan-gagir
Malka Polyana Küçük-alan, Köy-çalı/Kücalı
Malka Smolnitsa Küçük Çamurlu, Çamurlu
Malki Voden Sül-büklün
Malko Asenovo Küçük-Hasan-tekke
Malko Borisovo Burunsuz
Malko Dolyane Dere-köy
Malko Gradishte Alvan-dere
Malko Kamenyane Taşlı-sütlü-dere
Malko Kirilovo Yeni-beyli
Malko Krushevo Ahatlar
Malko Paisievo Soğanlık-yeni-mahalle
Malko Popovo Hoca-köy
Malko Selo Küçükler
Malko Shivachevo Kara-terziler
Malko Tarnovo Tırnovacık
Malko Topolovo Tahtalı
Malko Tsarkvishte Tekkeler-cami
Malkoch Malkoç-dere
Malkochovo Malkoç-ova
Malogradets Papazlar
Malo Konare Doğan-ova, Küçük-koru-köy
Malomir Karapça, Sofular
Malomirovo Ambarlı/Hambarlı
Malovets Mumcu-köy
Mamarchevo Murat-hanlı
Momina Banya Sulu-derbent
Manastirsko Tekke-mahalle
Manastirtsi Tekke
Manolovo Küçük-oba, Zurnacılar
Manushevtsi Çanakçık
Marchino Kuyucuk
Marinka Kara-gözler
Marino Pole Mintişli
Maritsa Meriç, Mahalle
Markovo Emirler, Sakarlar
Martino Apazlar
Maslarevo Yağcı
Maslinovo Yağlı
Matovtsi Hacı-Kamber-mahalle
Maysko Tuzlu-alan
Maystorovo Rüstemler
Mazhentsi Şahinler
Meche Uho Ay-kulak
Mechovo Aydın-köy
Meden Buk Balcı-bük
Meden Kladenets Ballı-pınar
Meden Rudnik Hocalar, Kara-bayır
Mednikarovo Kara-pelit
Medova Balcı-köy
Medovets Sarı-kovanlık
Medovina Balcı-Omur
Medovitsa Balca
Medovo Balcı-köy, Yeni-çeşme
Medoveve Bal-pnar-yenice
Melnik Menlik
Melnitsa Değirmen-dere
Mengushevo Köpek-köy
Menkovo Memeler
Merdanya Merdane
Metlichina Ali-Paşa, Ambarlık/Hambarlık
Metlichka Muharrem-oğulları
Metlika Murat-Paşalar
Metodievo Çavuş-ova, Küpeler
Mezdra Mezra
Mezhden Yeni-mahalle
Mihailovo Gök-pala
Mihaltsi Mihallar
Mihaylovgrad Kutlu-viçe
Miladinovtsi Cevizli-kalfa, Kalfa-köy, Değnekler
Milanovo Veli-bey
Miletich Bezirgan/Bazirgan
Milino Keremedin
Mineralni Bani Meriçler
Minzuhar Kalfalar
Mirovets Selim-köy
Mirovitsi Murat-allar
Mirovo Paşa-köy, Seymen
Miryantsi Müslim
Mishevsko Kuyucuk-viran
Mishev Küçük-viran
Mitnitsa Bulanık
Mlada Gvardiya Beyli
Mladezhko Karamlık
Mladinovo Yeni-köy
Mladovo Genç-Ali
Mlechen Ayran/Ayran-köy
Mlechino Süt-kesiği
Mogila Muhla
Mogilishte Özlü-bey-köy/Özgü-benlik
Mogolitsa Toz-burun
Momchilovtsi Yukarı-dere-köy
Morishta Yağmurlu
Momchil İdris-kuyusu
Momchilgrad Mestanlı, Sultanyeri
Momchilovo Esetli
Momina Banya Hisar-köseler
Momina Salza Kız-köy
 Kız-mahalle, Kızan-tekke 
Momino Selo Muratlı
Momino Tsarkva Kız-kilise
Mominska Kasımlar
Momkovo Oğlanlı/Ohlanlı
Montana Kutlu Viçe, Kutlofçe, Kutlofça
Morava Marafta, Hacı-Musa
Moraven Karadır
Moravka Kara-dilli
Moravitsa Demirciler
Morozovo Simitler
Morsko Denizler
Mortogonovo Ağmaç-köy/Omaç-köy
Moryantsi Deniz-koyluç, Geren, Kara-pınar
Moskovets Tatar
Mosten Köprülü
Mostich Mahmut-köy
Mostino Celep-köprü
Mostovo Er-köprü
Mramor Yeni-köy
Mozorovo Sünnetler
Mount Musala Musalla dağı, Maşallah dağı, Tangra dağı, Tanrı dağı
Mrezhichko Tüler, Yusuf-çobanlar
Murgovo Esmerli
Musachevo Musa-Çelebi
Muselievo Musalı
Musevo Köprü-başı
Nadar Nadır-köy
Nadarevo Nadır
Nadezhda Hacı-Hüseyin-mahalle
Nadezhdino Satı-bey
Nanavish Ali-Bey-konağı
Nane Nanazlı-dere/Narazlı-dere
Nasreshtna Karşı-mahalle
Nauchene Örenli
Naum Aslar
Novo Malko Koshnichari Sepetçi
Nayden Gerovo Demir-dişli
Nebeska Felekler
Nedelevo Nasva-köy
Nedelino Uzundere
Nedelkovo Baba
Nenkovo Fisallar
Nesebar Misivri
Nevestino Gerdeli
Nevski Sultan
Neykovo Karalar
Nikola Kozlevo Civel
Nikolaevo Eşekçi, Cembek-mahalle, Yeniköy, Yürükler, Yaya-köy
Nikolovo Lipnik
Nikopol Niğbolu
Neofit Rilski Kutlu-bey
Nochevo Taşlık
Novachevo Yeniköy
Novak Yenice
Nova Kamena Şahinler
Novakovo Yeni Mahalle
Nova Livada Yeniçayır
Nova Mahala Yeni Mahalle
Nova Popina Hoca-köy
Nova Zagora Yeni Zağra, Zağra-i Cedid, Zağra Yenicesi
Novgrad Yeni-şehir
Nozharovo Kılıçlar
Novi Han Yenihan
Novi Pazar Yeni Pazar
Novo Oryahovo Yeniderviş
Novoselest Köse-mahalle
Novo Selishte Kuşalılar, Yeni Mahalle
Novo Selo Novasel, Yeni Köy, Kaba-ağaç, Yeni-mahalle
Novo Selo, Stara Zagora Province, Yanaklar
Novo Zhelezari Demirciler
Obitel Tekkeler/Tekkeler-kebir
Obruchishte Obruklu
Obzor Gözeken
Odaite Odalar
Odalchensko Hacı-Mehmetler
Odartsi Yastıkçılar
Odrintsi Yeni-mahalle
Ograzhden Hasırlık
Ognyanovo Göreci, Küçük-Ahmet
Ohlyuvets Sulu-köy
Okop İnce-hisarlı
Okorsh Musalar, Rahman-aşıklar
Omur Hacı-Abdul-mahallesi
Omurtag Osman Pazar, Alakilise, Osmanlar, Osmanpazarı
Opaka Hacı Yürük
Orach Alvanlar/Albanlar, Orlanlar
Orhanovo Orlan-köy
Orlovo Musatlı/Mustalı
Osenets Hüseyinçe
Osenovets Işık-köy
Orehovitsa Rako-viçe
Oreshak Cevizli
Oreshane Kerimler
Oreshari Kozluca
Oreshets Kozluca
Oreshino Kozluca
Oreshnik Haydar-ova, Kozluca, Pirli-davulcular-mahalle
Oreshnitsa Hısımlar
Orizare Baraklı
Orizari Ayran
Orlino Boz-alan
Orlov Dol Şahin-dere
Orlova Mogila Serdimen
Orlovets Er-doğanlı
Orlyak Turpçular
Orlyane Diksan-mahalle
Oryahovets Kozluca
Oryahovo Yeni Rahova, Rahova, Kozluca, Saranlı
Osenets Sofular
Osenovo Diş-budak
Osetenovo Doymuşlar
Osmanovo Osman-paşalar
Osmantsi Osmanlar
Ostar Kamak Sivri-kaya
Ostra Mogila Ada-tepe, Sütçüler
Ostreshtina Öte-mahalle
Ostrets Yalımlar
Ostrov Ada
Ostrovche Küçük-ada-köy
Ostrovo Büyük-ada
Otets Kirilovo Kireççi/Kürekçi
Otets Paisievo Koçmalar
Ovchari Çoban-köy
Ovcharovo Çoban-dere, Kalfa/Yürük-kalfa, Koyunlu, Kulanlı
Ovchartsi Çobanlar, Maya-kurfalı
Ovchepoltsi Firuzlu
Ovchevo Sipahiler/İspahlar
Ovchi Kladenets Koyun-pınar
Oven Kara-koç
Padina Davulcular
Padrino Bahadırlar
Paisevo Doğancılar/Doğacılar
Paisiy Arnavutlu
Panagyurishte Otlukköy, Panagürişte, Otluk
Panchevo Ayvacık
Panichare Çanakçılar
Panichino Çanakçılar
Parvan Başlar
Parvenets Başalı, Değirmen-dere
Parvomay Hacı İlyas, Hacı
Pastir Çoban-kuyusu
Pastirtsi Çoban
Pastro Gor Ala-dağ
Pastro Ok Ala-gözler
Pastrovo Ala-gün
Pazardzhik Pazarcık, Tatar Pazarcı
Peevsko Boyacılar
Pernik Pernik
Perushtitsa Peruştiçe
Peshtera Peştere
Pesnopoy Aşıklar, Çukurlu
Petko Slaveykov Akıncılar
Petrich Petriç
Petrov Dol Dere-köy
Pet Kladentsi Beş-pınar
Peti Kladentsi Beş-kuyucuk
Pet Mogili Beş-tepe
Petrino Çıkrıkçılar
Pevets Aşık-ova
Pevtsite Aşıklar
Peychinovo Burunlu
Pishtigovo Aygır-köy
Pishurka Boz-kırı
Plachidol Ahıç-köy/Alıç-köy
Planinets Cabirler/Cebiller
Planintsa Çepelce
Pleven Plevne, Pilevne
Pliska Ağababa, Ağa Baba
Ploska Mogila Çırpılı
Plovdiv Filibe
Plovdivtsi Büyük-dere
Pobit Kamak Dikili-taş
Pod Ayva Ayva-altı
Podgorets Büyük-hediyatlar
Podgoritsa Ak-Mehmetler
Podrudzhanovo Aratmaca
Podrumche Değirmen-viran
Polkovnik Dyakovo Araplar, Azaplar
Polkovnik Savovo Diş-budak
Polkovnik Serafimovo Alami-dere
Polkovnik Sveshtarovo Baş-pınar
Polkovnik Taslakov Bahar-köy
Polyana Ay-orman, Burgucu-köy
Polyatsite Bekçi
Pomorie Ahyolu, Ahiyolu
Popovo Popköy
Poroishte Anavut/Arnaut
Poroyna Dere-köy
Posev Ekincik
Postnik Ahat-Baba
Potocharka Ada-İbaylı
Potoche Dere-köy
Potochnik Ada-köy
Pravda Doğrular
Pravdino Doruklu
Pravdolyub Celiller
Praventsi Doruklu
Presechen Boğaz-kesen
Preseka Çatak
Presentsi Baş-hasırcık
Preslav Eski İstanbolluk
Presyan Boğaz-kesen
Pridzhad Ahlatlı
Prilep Bayram-dere
Pripek Aciz-dar, Cizdar-köy
Prohod Derbent-dere
Prolaz Derbent
Prolom Boğaz
Prosenik Buruncuk
Provadiya Prevadi, Pirivadi, Pirvadi
Pryaporets Baraklı, Bayraktar-mahalle
Ptichar Ahatlı
Radnevo Radne Mahalle
Radomir Radomir
Rakitovo Rakit Ova
Rakovski Kılıçlı (Altın boğa, Kılıçlı sarı), Baltacı, Ali Fıkıh (Veled-i-danişmend)
Razgrad Hezargrad, Hazargrad, Hazregrad
Razlog Razlık
Rila Rila
Rousse Rusçuk, Urusçuk
Ruen Ulanlı, Oğlanlı
Rusokastro Rusikasrı, Ruskasrı, Urusa Kesri
Sadovo Çeşnegir
Saedinenie Kalfa
Samokov Samoko, Samaku
Samuil Aşıklar, Işıklar
Sevlievo Selvi, Servi, Hotaliç
Shabla Şabla
Shipka Şipka
Shumen Şumnu
Simeonovgrad Seymen
Silistra Silistre
Simitli Simitli
Sinemorets Kalanca
Sitovo Doymuşlar
Sliven İslimye
Smolyan Paşmaklı, Ahi Çelebi
Sofia Sofya, Serdik
Sozopol Süzebolu, Sizebolu
Sredets Sülmeşli
Stamboliyski Sinecik
Stambolovo Eller
Stara Zagora Eski Zağra, Zağra-i Atik
Straldzha Istralca
Strazhitsa Kadı Köy
Strelcha İstirelçe
Struma (river) Ustruma Karasu, Karasu
Suhindol Suhundol, Söğün Dal
Sungurlare Sungurlar
Suvorovo Kozluca
Svilengrad Cisr-i Mustafapaşa
Svishtov Ziştovi
Targovishte Eski Cuma, Tırgovişte, Cuma-i Zir
Tervel Kurt Pınar
Teteven Teteven
Topolovgrad Kavaklı
Tran Turan, Taran
Tran valley (Znepole) İznebolu
Tryavna Trevne, Travna
Tsar Kaloyan Torlak
Tsarevo Kestiriç
Tsenovo Şen Ova
Tundzha Tunca
Tutrakan Turtukaya, Turtulkaya
Uzundzhovo Uzuncaova
Varna Varna
Veliki Preslav Eski İstanbulluk
Veliko Tarnovo Tırnova
Velingrad Velingrad
Venets Köklüce
Vetovo Vet Ova
Vetrino Yassı Tepe
Vidin Vidin
Vratsa İvrace, İvraca, İvraça
Yahinovo Yahinbey
Yakoruda Yakorit
Yambol Yanbolu, Yambolu
Zavet Zavut
Zlatitsa İzladin, İzladi
Zlatograd Darıdere

References

Bulgaria
Turkish exonyms in Bulgaria
Turkish
Turkish